Harper Ridge is a nearly ice-free ridge in Antarctica,  long and rising to over . It extends north from the central part of the Finger Ridges in the Cook Mountains, toward Yamagata Ridge. It was named after Doyal A. Harper of the University of Chicago Yerkes Observatory, Williams Bay, Wisconsin, director of the Center for Astrophysical Research in Antarctica at South Pole Station for several years from 1991.

References

External links

Ridges of Oates Land